James Edward Costa (born May 12, 1990) is an American actor, voice actor, producer, writer, and a director. Costa is known for his roles as the titular characters in the fan films Kenobi: A Star Wars Story and Han Solo: A Smuggler's Trade. He is set to make his debut in the crime-thriller film, Bring Him to Me.

Early life 
Jamie Costa was born on May 12, 1990, and grew up in Charleston, South Carolina. He attended private Christian schools up until high school when he was sent to a military boarding school in V.A. where he ended up graduating highest-ranking cadet. He briefly attended college at The Citadel and eventually ended up studying theater at North Greenville University in South Carolina. He took a semester to study film in Los Angeles, and  then finally graduated in December 2013.

Career 
Starting in 2015, Costa began posting impersonations on YouTube, including Robin Williams, Ian McKellen, Owen Wilson, Matthew McConaughey, and  Harrison Ford.

In July 2015, Costa moved to LA to continue his career in acting and filmmaking and has since appeared in various film and television projects both on screen and as a voice over artist. He has produced and acted in Star Wars fan films hosted on his YouTube channel.

In 2022, in an interview with Silver Screen magazine, Costa announced that he will have a guest role on one of the episodes for the Netflix Adult Animated Series: Agent King starring Matthew McConaughey as  Elvis, and will be working on an original series called Hollywood Tall Tales with director and writer, Jake Lewis.

Costa is part of the supporting cast on the feature film Bring Him to Me, a mob thriller in production as of December 2022, alongside actors Barry Pepper and Sam Neill.

Robin test footage
In 2021, Costa uploaded a five minute piece of test footage titled, "ROBIN Test Footage Scene," which stars Costa as Robin Williams. The scene shows Williams in his trailer preparing for an episode of Mork & Mindy. While doing so, his co-star Pam Dawber (portrayed by Sarah Murphree) enters and brings news of John Belushi's passing, with Williams' reaction.

The footage received positive responses from critics and audiences, with Costa's performance being the subject of articles from CNN, USA Today, The National Post, and People Magazine. The footage sparked fans' interest for a feature length biographical film starring Costa. Williams' daughter, Zelda Williams wrote, "I've seen it. Jamie is SUPER talented, this isn't against him, but y'all spamming me an impression of my late Dad on one of his saddest days is weird."

Filmography

Film

Television

Web series

Video games

Stage

References

External links
 

1990 births
21st-century American male actors
Living people
Male actors from Charleston, South Carolina
North Greenville University alumni
American male film actors
American male television actors
American people of Italian descent